Ustia is a village in Dubăsari District, Moldova.

Media
 Jurnal FM - 98.7 MHz

Notable people
 Ștefan Urâtu

References

Villages of Dubăsari District
Populated places on the Dniester